Julius J. "Geechie" Fields (September 9, 1904 – August 15, 1997) was an American jazz trombonist.

Early life 
Fields grew up in Charleston, South Carolina, and learned to play trombone at the Jenkins Orphanage.

Career 
In the early 1920s he became a touring member of the Jenkins Orphanage bands, then relocated to New York City, where he was a house musician at John O'Connor's club. Primarily a trombonist, he was also credited as playing the alto saxophone and clarinet. He played with Earle Howard in 1926 and 1927, recorded with Jelly Roll Morton in 1928 and 1930, and with Charlie Skeete and Bill Benford in 1929. He also worked with Clarence Williams and James P. Johnson.

Personal life 
In the 1930s, Fields married singer Myra Johnson. He later left music to become a boxing coach.

References

Further reading
L. Wright: Mr. Jelly Lord (Chigwell, England, 1980)
Tom Lord: Clarence Williams (Chigwell, England, 1976)
John Chilton: A Jazz Nursery: the Story of the Jenkins Orphanage Bands of Charleston, South Carolina (London, 1980)

1904 births
1997 deaths
African-American jazz musicians
American jazz trombonists
Male trombonists
Musicians from South Carolina
20th-century trombonists
20th-century American male musicians
American male jazz musicians
20th-century African-American musicians